Antônio Xerxenesky (born 1984) is a Brazilian writer. He was born in Porto Alegre. He is known for books such as Areia nos dentes (debut novel, 2008), A página assombrada por fantasmas (short stories, 2011) and Asquestions (2017). He is a regular contributor to newspapers, magazines and blogs. His work has been adapted for TV (namely the short story ‘O desvio’ in 2007). His fiction has been translated into English, French, Spanish, Italian and Arabic.  
 
In 2012, he was named by Granta magazine as one of the best young Brazilian writers. He attended the International Writing Program at the University of Iowa in 2015. He has also done a residency at the Fondation Jan Michalski in Montricher, Switzerland.

He lives in São Paulo.

References

21st-century Brazilian writers
Living people
1984 births